Warren Steed Jeffs (born December 3, 1955) is an American religious leader and convicted child rapist. He is the president of the Fundamentalist Church of Jesus Christ of Latter-Day Saints (FLDS Church), a polygamous denomination of the Latter Day Saint movement. In 2011, he was convicted of two felony counts of child sexual assault, for which he is serving a life sentence plus twenty years.

In 2006, Jeffs was placed on the FBI's Ten Most Wanted List for his flight from the charges that he had arranged illegal marriages between his adult male followers and underage girls in Utah. In 2007, Arizona charged him with eight additional counts in two separate cases, including incest and sexual conduct with minors.

In September 2007, Jeffs was convicted of two counts of rape as an accomplice, for which he was sentenced to imprisonment for ten years to life in Utah State Prison. This conviction was overturned by the Utah Supreme Court in 2010 due to flawed jury instructions.

Jeffs was extradited to Texas, where he was found guilty of sexual assault of a minor, for raping a 15-year-old he had ‘married’; and aggravated sexual assault against a child, for raping a 12-year-old he had ‘married’; for which he was sentenced to life in prison, plus twenty years and fined $10,000. Jeffs is incarcerated at the Louis C. Powledge Unit of the TDCJ near Palestine, Texas.

Family and early life

Warren Steed Jeffs was born on December 3, 1955, to Rulon Jeffs (1909–2002) and Merilyn Steed (born circa 1935). Warren was born more than two months prematurely in Sacramento, California.

Rulon Jeffs became the President of the Fundamentalist Church of Jesus Christ of Latter-Day Saints (FLDS Church) in 1986 and had nineteen or twenty wives and approximately 60 children. Former church members claim that Warren himself has 87 wives. Warren grew up outside of Salt Lake City, Utah, and for more than twenty years served as the principal of Alta Academy, an FLDS private school at the mouth of Little Cottonwood Canyon. Jeffs became principal in 1976, the year he turned 21. He was known for being "a stickler for the rules and for discipline."

Church leadership
Prior to his father's death in 2002, Jeffs held the position of counselor to the church leader. Jeffs became Rulon's successor with his official title in the FLDS Church becoming "President and Prophet, Seer and Revelator" as well as "President of the Priesthood". The latter concerned being head of the organization of all adult male church members who were deemed worthy to hold the priesthood, a tradition carried on in the Latter Day Saint movement.

Following Rulon's death, Jeffs told the high-ranking FLDS officials, "I won't say much, but I will say thishands off my father's wives." When addressing his father's widows he said, "You women will live as if Father is still alive and in the next room." Within a week he had married all but two of his father's wives; one refused to marry Jeffs and was subsequently prohibited from ever marrying again, while the other, Rebecca Wall, fled the FLDS compound. Naomi Jessop, one of the first of Rulon's former wives to marry Jeffs, subsequently became his favorite wife and confidant. As the sole individual in the FLDS Church with the authority to perform marriages, Jeffs was responsible for assigning wives to husbands. He also had the authority to discipline male church members by "reassigning their wives, children and homes to another man."

Until courts in Utah intervened, Jeffs controlled almost all of the land in Colorado City, Arizona, and Hildale, Utah, which was part of a church trust called the United Effort Plan (UEP). The land has been estimated to be worth over $100 million. All UEP assets were put in the custody of the Utah court system pending further litigation. As the result of a November 2012 court decision, much of the UEP land is to be sold to those who live on it.

In January 2004, Jeffs expelled a group of twenty men from the Short Creek Community, including the mayor, and reassigned their wives and children to other men in the community. Jeffs, like his predecessors, continued the standard FLDS and Mormon fundamentalist tenet that faithful men must follow what is known as the doctrine of plural marriage in order to attain exaltation in the afterlife. Jeffs specifically taught that a devoted church member is expected to have at least three wives in order to get into heaven, and the more wives a man has, the closer he is to heaven.

Changes in location, leadership
Before his 2006 arrest, Jeffs had last been seen on January 1, 2005, near Eldorado, Texas, at the dedication ceremony of the foundation of a large FLDS temple on the YFZ Ranch. The ranch came into the public eye on April 7, 2008, when Texas authorities conducted a raid and took legal custody of 416 children, in response to a March 31 phone call alleging physical and sexual abuse on the ranch. The caller claimed to be a 16-year-old girl married to a 50-year-old man, and stated that she had given birth to his child a year prior. Residents, however, told authorities that there was in fact no such girl, and the calls were ultimately traced to 33-year-old Rozita Swinton, totally unconnected to the FLDS Church, and known for repeated instances of filing false reports. Nevertheless, Texas authorities continued to investigate whether Swinton's claims were a hoax. The women and children who were suspected of being minors were returned after Texas courts established that the state had not presented sufficient evidence of abuse to have removed them.

On June 10, 2006, Arizona Attorney General Terry Goddard told the Deseret News that he had heard from several sources that Jeffs had returned to Arizona, and had performed marriage ceremonies in a mobile home that was being used as a wedding chapel.

On March 27, 2007, the Deseret News reported that Jeffs had renounced his role as prophet of the FLDS Church in a conversation with his brother Nephi. Nephi quoted him as saying he was "the greatest of all sinners" and that God had never called him to be a prophet. Jeffs presented a handwritten note to the judge at the end of trial on March 27, saying that he was not a prophet of the FLDS Church. On November 7, the Washington County, Utah, Attorney's Office released video of jailhouse conversations between Nephi and Jeffs, in which Jeffs renounces his prophethood, claiming that God had told him that if he revealed that he was not the rightful prophet, and was a "wicked man", he would still gain a place in the celestial kingdom. Jeffs also admits to what he calls "immoral actions with a sister and a daughter" when he was 20 years old. Other records show that while incarcerated, Jeffs tried to commit suicide by banging his head against the walls and trying to hang himself.

Jeffs formally resigned as President of the FLDS Church effective November 20, 2007. In an email to the Deseret News, Jeffs' attorneys made the following statements: "Mr. Jeffs has asked that the following statement be released to the media and to members of the Fundamentalist Church of Jesus Christ of Latter-Day Saints... Mr. Jeffs resigned as President of the Corporation of the President of The Fundamentalist Church of Jesus Christ of Latter-Day Saints Inc." The statement did not address his ecclesiastical position as prophet of the FLDS Church, and many in the FLDS communities still regard him as the prophet and their current leader. There are also reports that Jeffs admitted his position of prophet in the FLDS Church was a usurpation in a conversation to his brother, and declared that "Brother William E. Jessop has been the prophet since [my] Father's passing", though Jeffs' attorneys have claimed he misspoke. In early 2011, Jeffs retook legal control of the denomination.

Sex crimes allegations and FBI's Most Wanted
In July 2004, Jeffs' nephew, Brent Jeffs, filed a lawsuit alleging that Jeffs had anally raped him in the FLDS Church's Salt Lake Valley compound in the late 1980s. Together with author Maia Szalavitz, Brent wrote the memoir Lost Boy, which recounts alleged incidents of child sexual abuse inflicted upon him by Jeffs, his brothers, and other family members, committed when Brent was aged 5 or 6. Brent's brother Clayne committed suicide after accusing Jeffs of sexually assaulting him as a child. Two of Jeffs' nephews and two of Jeffs' own children have also publicly claimed to have been sexually abused by him.

In June 2005, Jeffs was charged in Mohave County, Arizona with sexual assault on a minor and with conspiracy to commit sexual misconduct with a minor for allegedly arranging, in April 2001, a marriage between a then-14-year-old girl and her 19-year-old first cousin, Allen. The young girl, Elissa Wall (then known as "Jane Doe IV," and the younger sister of Rebecca Wall), testified that she begged Rulon Jeffs to let her wait until she was older or choose another man for her. The elder Jeffs was apparently "sympathetic," but his son was not, and she was forced to go through with the marriage. Wall alleged that Allen often raped her and that she repeatedly miscarried. She eventually left Allen and the community.

In July 2005, the Arizona Attorney General's office distributed wanted posters offering $10,000 for information leading to Jeffs' arrest and conviction. On October 28, Jeffs' brother Seth was arrested under suspicion of harboring a fugitive. During a routine traffic stop in Pueblo County, Colorado, police found nearly $142,000 in cash, $7,000 worth of prepaid debit cards and personal records. During Seth's court case, FBI Agent Andrew Stearns testified that Seth had told him that he did not know where his older brother was and that he would not reveal his whereabouts if he did. Seth was convicted of harboring a fugitive on May 1, 2006. On July 14, he was sentenced to three years' probation and a $2,500 fine.

On April 5, 2006, Utah issued an arrest warrant for Jeffs on felony charges of accomplice rape of a teenage girl between 14 and 18 years old. Shortly after, on May 6, the FBI placed Jeffs on its Top Ten Most Wanted Fugitives list, offering a $60,000 reward. He was the 482nd fugitive listed on the list. The reward was soon raised to $100,000, and the public was warned that "Jeffs may travel with a number of loyal and armed bodyguards."

On June 8, 2006, Jeffs returned to Colorado City to perform more "child-bride marriages." On May 27, 2008, The Smoking Gun website released images of Jeffs with two underage wives, one of whom was 12 years old, celebrating first wedding anniversaries in 2005 and 2006.

Arrest, trial and conviction
On August 28, 2006, around 9 p.m. PDT, Jeffs was pulled over on Interstate 15 in Clark County, Nevada, by highway trooper Eddie Dutchover because the temporary license plates on his red 2007 Cadillac Escalade were not visible. One of Jeffs' wives, Naomi Jessop, and his brother Isaac were with him. Jeffs possessed four computers, sixteen cell phones, disguises (including three wigs and twelve pairs of sunglasses), and more than $55,000 in cash. Jeffs' wife and brother were questioned and released.

In a Nevada court hearing on August 31, Jeffs waived extradition and agreed to return to Utah to face two first-degree felony charges of accomplice rape. Each charge carries an indeterminate penalty of five years to life in prison. Arizona prosecutors were next in line to try Jeffs. He was held in the Washington County jail, pending an April 23, 2007, trial on two counts of rape, as an accomplice for his role in arranging the marriage between Elissa Wall and her first cousin.

Jeffs was believed to be leading his group from jail and a Utah state board has expressed dissatisfaction in dealing with Hildale police, believing that many members of the force had ties to Jeffs, so therefore did not cooperate. In May and July 2007, Jeffs was indicted in Arizona on eight counts, including sexual misconduct with a minor and incest.

Jeffs' trial began on September 11, 2007, in St. George, Utah, with Judge James L. Shumate presiding. Jeffs was housed in Utah's Purgatory Correctional Facility in solitary confinement for the duration. At the culmination of the trial, on September 25, Jeffs was found guilty of two counts of being an accomplice to rape. He was sentenced to prison for ten years to life and began serving his sentence at the Utah State Prison. On July 27, 2010, the Utah Supreme Court, citing deficient jury instructions, reversed Jeffs' convictions and ordered a new trial. The court found that the trial judge should have told the jury that Jeffs could not be convicted unless he intended for Elissa's husband to engage in nonconsensual sex with her. Elissa subsequently wrote an autobiography on her experiences in the FLDS Church and with Jeffs entitled Stolen Innocence. The book was co-authored with former New York Times journalist Lisa Pulitzer.

Jeffs was also scheduled to be tried in Arizona. He had entered a not-guilty plea on February 27, 2008, to sex charges stemming from the arranged marriages of three teenaged girls to older men. He was transported to the Mohave County jail to await trial. On June 9, 2010, a state judge, at the request of Mohave County prosecutor Matt Smith, dismissed all charges with prejudice. Smith said that the Arizona victims no longer wanted to testify and that Jeffs had spent almost two years in jail awaiting more than he would have received had he been convicted. Combined with the pending charges against Jeffs in Texas, Smith concluded that "it would be impractical and unnecessary" to try Jeffs in Arizona. Jeffs was then returned to Utah; at the time, his appeal of the 2007 conviction was still pending.

On August 9, 2011, Jeffs was convicted in Texas on two counts of sexual assault of a child and sentenced to life in prison. Warren Jeffs, Texas Department of Criminal Justice #01726705, will be eligible for parole on July 22, 2038.

Prison life
Jeffs tried to hang himself in jail in 2007 in Utah. On July 9, 2008, he was taken from the Mohave County, Arizona jail in Kingman, Arizona to a Las Vegas, Nevada hospital for what was described as a serious medical problem. Sheriff Tom Sheahan did not specify Jeffs' medical problem but said it was serious enough to move him about 100 miles from the Kingman Regional Medical Center to the Nevada hospital.

Jeffs has engaged in lengthy hunger strikes, which his doctors and attorneys have claimed were for spiritual reasons. In August 2009, Superior Court Judge Steve Conn ordered that Jeffs be force-fed at the Arizona jail.

On August 29, 2011, Jeffs was taken to East Texas Medical Center, Tyler, Texas, and hospitalized in critical condition under a medically induced coma after excessive fasting. Officials were not sure how long he would remain hospitalized, but expected Jeffs to live. Jeffs is incarcerated at the Louis C. Powledge Unit of the TDCJ near Palestine, Texas.

Jeffs predicted in December 2012 that the world would end before 2013 and called for his followers to prepare for the end.

The United Effort Plan (UEP) trust that formerly belonged to the FLDS was taken over by Utah in 2005 and controlled by the court for over a decade, before a judge handed it over to a community board mostly composed of former sect members. In 2017, both the trust and Jeffs were sued by a woman alleging she was sexually abused by Jeffs when she was a child. Jeffs allegedly suffered a mental breakdown in the summer of 2019, leaving him unfit to give a deposition in the sex abuse case against him. Attorneys representing the UEP community trust contended that forcing him to testify would be “futile.” The plaintiff's attorney said there is a lack of evidence to support a claim of Jeff's incompetency, accusing the trust of being "understandably very fearful" about Jeffs' testimony since it is liable for his actions as the past president of the FLDS.

Current FLDS members continue to consider Jeffs to be their leader and prophet who speaks to God and who has been wrongly convicted.

Views

End times 
In the FLDS Priesthood History, Jeffs stated that “today the Lord rules over this people through President Jeffs, yet we’re under the bondage of the gentiles here in America. Soon the Lord will overthrow our nation and the priesthood people will rule over this land because the priesthood people will be the only ones left.”

While in prison, he made several end times predictions.

View on marriage 
In a 2001 sermon, Jeffs stated that "the people grew so evil, the men started to marry the men and the women married the women. This is the worst evil act you can do, next to murder. It is like murder. Whenever people commit that sin, then the Lord destroys them."

View on race 
He made the following declaration about the Beatles: 

In 2005, Southern Poverty Law Center's Intelligence Report published the following statements made by Jeffs:
 "The black race is the people through which the devil has always been able to bring evil unto the earth."
 In a 1995 Priesthood History Class, Jeffs stated that Cain was "cursed with a black skin and he is the father of the Negro people … He has great power, can appear and disappear … He is used by the devil, as a mortal man, to do great evils … If you, young people, were to marry a Negro, you could not be a priesthood person, even if you repented. You could not stay in this work."
 "Today you can see a black man with a white woman, et cetera. A great evil has happened on this land because the devil knows that if all the people have Negro blood, there will be nobody worthy to have the priesthood."
 "If you marry a person who has connections with the Negro, you would become cursed."

In popular culture

In print
 
  An autobiography about a girl inside the FLDS Church and her experiences in the community and her escape as well as her accounts in the Jeffs trial.
  A book about Jeffs and the FLDS Church, which chronicles the details of Jeffs' rise to power, the activities of church members in Colorado City and Hildale and their trials.
  An autobiography concerning his youth and interactions with his uncle Warren.
  Private Investigator Brower's account of his research about Jeffs and the FLDS Church and pursuit of justice for them.
  Documents the history of the FLDS Church, including Jeffs' role.
 Jeffs, Rachel (2017). Breaking Free: How I Escaped Polygamy, the FLDS Cult, and My Father, Warren Jeffs.  Harper. .  Memoir of the daughter of Warren Jeffs, who escaped from the secretive polygamist Mormon fundamentalist cult run by her family

Films and documentaries
 The 2005 Regional Emmy and Edward R. Murrow Award-winning documentary Colorado City and the Underground Railroad, by Mike Watkiss
 The 2006 documentary feature, Damned to Heaven, produced by Pawel Gula and Tom Elliott. The film premiered in Europe at the Kraków Film Festival in Poland. In September 2007, it premiered in the U.S. at the Temecula Valley International Film Festival, where it received honors in the Best Documentary category. The film investigates the practice of plural marriage, and includes 20 minutes of Jeffs' original teachings, recorded for the purpose of educating followers.
 The 2006 documentary film Banking on Heaven documents Jeffs and the FLDS Church in Colorado City, Arizona.
 On July 19, 2006, Britain's Channel 4 ran the documentary The Man with 80 Wives. The program featured presenter Sanjiv Bhattacharya's unsuccessful search for Jeffs in Colorado, Utah, and Texas.
 The 2010 documentary Sons of Perdition describes life inside FLDS including Jeffs' control over the church's members. The film focuses on the experiences of children who have left the FLDS church. The movie was directed by Tyler Measom and Jennilyn Merten. "Sons of perdition" is a derogatory term used by the FLDS Church to describe former members who have apostatized from their religion and faith.
 On April 9, 2012, the National Geographic Channel aired a 45-minute documentary, I Escaped a Cult, about three ex-members of religious cults. One story featured Brent W. Jeffs, nephew of Jeffs, whose testimony was critical in getting Jeffs convicted.
 On June 28, 2014, Lifetime aired a movie called Outlaw Prophet: Warren Jeffs starring Tony Goldwyn. It is an adaptation of the non-fiction book When Men Become Gods (2009) by Stephen Singular.
 The 2015 documentary film, Prophet's Prey,  directed by Amy J. Berg. It is an adaptation of Sam Brower's book of the same name.^
 On January 22, 2017, Investigation Discovery aired Jeffs' story in season 2, episode 3 of the original series Evil Lives Here in an episode entitled "My Brother, The Devil." It was told from the point of view of Jeffs' brother Wallace and nephew Brent.
 On February 19, 2018, A&E aired a documentary called Warren Jeffs: Prophet of Evil.
 On April 26, 2022, Peacock aired a documentary series called Preaching Evil: A Wife on the Run With Warren Jeffs which documented Jeffs rise to power, told from the perspective of Jeffs' favored wife and scribe, Naomie.<ref>{{cite news |last1=Priola |first1=Victoria|title=Ex-wife of cult leader Warren Jeffs speaks out in Peacock documentary 'Preaching Evil': How to watch |url=https://www.pennlive.com/life/2022/04/ex-wife-of-warren-jeffs-speaks-out-in-peacock-documentary-how-to-watch-preaching-evil.html |access-date=July 24, 2022|work= The Patriot-News|date=April 26, 2022}}</ref>
 On June 8, 2022, Netflix aired a documentary series called Keep Sweet: Pray and Obey documenting the story of Jeffs and the FLDS church.

See also

 Legality of polygamy
 List of polygamy court cases
 Placement marriage
 Mormon abuse cases#Fundamentalist abuse cases
 Under the Banner of Heaven''
 Lyle Jeffs
 Winston Blackmore

References

Further reading
 
 Carolyn Jessop  with Laura Palmer (2007), Escape, Penguin Books

1955 births
Living people
20th-century apocalypticists
21st-century American criminals
21st-century apocalypticists
American Latter Day Saint leaders
American people convicted of child sexual abuse
American people of English descent
American prisoners sentenced to life imprisonment
American members of the clergy convicted of crimes
American white supremacists
American rapists
Criminals from California
Fundamentalist Church of Jesus Christ of Latter-Day Saints members
Mormon fundamentalist leaders
Mormonism-related controversies
People extradited within the United States
People from Sacramento, California
People from Washington County, Utah
People from Mohave County, Arizona
Prisoners sentenced to life imprisonment by Texas
Prophets in Mormonism
Religious figures convicted of child sexual abuse